Imes is an unincorporated community in Franklin County, Kansas, United States.  It is located southeast of Ottawa at about 4 miles south of  K-68 on Tennessee Road

History
Imes had a post office from 1881 until 1917, but the post office was called Larimore until 1887.

References

Further reading

External links
 Franklin County maps: Current, Historic, KDOT

Unincorporated communities in Franklin County, Kansas
Unincorporated communities in Kansas